Belfast West was a borough constituency of the Parliament of Northern Ireland from 1921 to 1929. It returned four MPs, using proportional representation by means of the single transferable vote.

Boundaries
Belfast West was created by the Government of Ireland Act 1920 and contained the Court, Falls, St Anne's, St George's, Smithfield and Woodvale wards of the County Borough of Belfast. The House of Commons (Method of Voting and Redistribution of Seats) Act (Northern Ireland) 1929 divided the constituency into four constituencies elected under first past the post: Belfast Central, Belfast Falls, Belfast St Anne's and Belfast Woodvale.

Second Dáil
In May 1921, Dáil Éireann, the parliament of the self-declared Irish Republic run by Sinn Féin, passed a resolution declaring that elections to the House of Commons of Northern Ireland and the House of Commons of Southern Ireland would be used as the election for the Second Dáil. All those elected were on the roll of the Second Dáil, but as no Sinn Féin MP was elected for Belfast West, it was not represented there.

Politics

Belfast West was a predominantly Unionist area with some pockets of Nationalist strength, electing three Unionists and one Nationalist in 1921 and one Unionists, one Independent Unionist, one Nationalist and one Labour Party member in 1925.

Members of Parliament

Election results 

Devlin did not take his seat.

Twaddell was assassinated on 22 May 1922:

Devlin did not take his seat.

References

Northern Ireland Parliament constituencies established in 1921
Northern Ireland Parliament constituencies disestablished in 1929
Constituencies of the Northern Ireland Parliament
Constituencies of the Northern Ireland Parliament in Belfast
Dáil constituencies in Northern Ireland (historic)